"Hoot" is the lead single from Hoot, the third EP of South Korean girl group Girls' Generation. It became the ninth hit song for the group, topped the chart in their nation. "Hoot" was released on October 25, 2010. A Japanese-language version was also released on their first Japanese album, Girls' Generation on June 1, 2011.

Background
"Hoot" was originally titled "Bulletproof" and written with English lyrics. It was composed by Danish songwriter-producers Martin Michael Larsson and Lars Halvor Jensen, of Deekay, together with British songwriter Alex James, with the intention of creating an "exciting up-tempo record for a female artist or group". The song demo was written and recorded in the UK, with Nina Woodford singing the vocal, and then finished and mixed in Denmark. Their publisher, Pelle Lidell of Universal Music Publishing Group, successfully pitched the song to S.M. Entertainment for Girls' Generation. Jensen later told HitQuarters: "We knew it was a strong record and a lot of the time you have to be patient until you find the right artist to cut it at the right time. Girls' Generation were that match." The song was then translated into Korean, but incorporated some of the original English words such as "trouble, trouble, trouble".

Rino Nakasone Razalan was the choreographer for the song.

According to a poll by Gallup Korea, "Hoot" was voted as the Song of the Year in South Korea in 2010.

Music video
The music video contains two settings: a white room and a black room. Throughout the video, there are scenes of the girls dancing in the black room dressed in black short suits with pink belts and high boots and in the white room dressed in golden suits with silver boots, but also in the beginning the girls are seen dancing in an elevator. In the music video are individual close-ups of their own unique personality.

The music video featured a parody of James Bond films' gun barrel sequence with a runtime of 34 seconds, and sampled Monty Norman & John Barry's score.

The music video was released on October 28, 2010. A member of boy band Super Junior, Choi Siwon, appeared in the role of a Bond-like guy as a cameo. The video's runtime is 4:13.

Performances
They held their comeback stage on October 29, 2010, on KBS's Music Bank. It was also performed on Show! Music Core, Inkigayo, and M! Countdown. They held their goodbye stage on December 4, 2010, on MBC's Show! Music Core.

Awards and nominations
 2nd Melon Music Awards: 2010 Hot Trend

Music programs awards

Credits

 Girls' Generation – Vocals
 Taeyeon – Main vocals, Background vocals
 Jessica – Main vocals, Background vocals
 Sunny – Vocals, Background vocals
 Tiffany – Lead vocals, Background vocals
 Hyoyeon – Vocals
 Yuri – Vocals
 Sooyoung – Vocals
 Yoona – Vocals
 Seohyun – Lead vocals

Chart performance

Weekly chart

Year-end chart

Sales

References

External links
 
 

2010 singles
Girls' Generation songs
SM Entertainment singles
Korean-language songs
Songs written by Alex James (songwriter)
Songs written by Lars Halvor Jensen
Songs written by Martin M. Larsson
Gaon Digital Chart number-one singles
2010 songs